Barbara Lubomirska is the name of:

 Barbara Lubomirska (17th century) (born 16th-century), Polish noble, fl 1611
 Barbara Lubomirska (18th century), daughter of Prince Jerzy Ignacy Lubomirski